Hymer is a ghost town in Diamond Creek Township, Chase County, Kansas, United States.  It was located northwest of Strong City along Diamond Creek Rd.

History
Hymer is a corruption of the surname of Frank and George Hegwer, original landowners.

A post office was opened in Hymer in 1872, and remained in operation until it was discontinued in 1943.

Hymer was a station on the Atchison, Topeka and Santa Fe Railway. In 1910, it contained a population of 30.

References

Further reading

External links
 Chase County maps: Current, Historic, KDOT

Unincorporated communities in Chase County, Kansas
Unincorporated communities in Kansas